This is the list of international prime ministerial trips made by Boris Johnson, who served as the 55th Prime Minister of the United Kingdom from 24 July 2019 until his resignation on 6 September 2022. Boris Johnson made 26 trips to 18 countries during his premiership.

The number of visits per country: 
 One visit to Finland, India, Ireland, Italy, Luxembourg, Oman, Rwanda, Saudi Arabia, Spain and Sweden.
 Two visits to Estonia, France, Poland, the UAE and the United States.
 Four visits to Germany and Ukraine.
 Five visits to Belgium.

2019

2020

2021

2022

Multilateral meetings
Boris Johnson participated in the following summits during his premiership:

See also
 Foreign relations of the United Kingdom
 List of international prime ministerial trips made by David Cameron
 List of international prime ministerial trips made by Theresa May
 List of international prime ministerial trips made by Rishi Sunak

References

International prime ministerial trips
2019 in international relations
2020 in international relations
2021 in international relations
2022 in international relations
State visits by British leaders
Foreign relations of the United Kingdom
Johnson
Lists of diplomatic trips
British prime ministerial visits
21st century in international relations
Johnson